Edward 'Ted' Levy was a professional rugby league footballer in the Australian competition the New South Wales Rugby League(NSWRL).

Levy played for the Eastern Suburbs club in the years 1947 and 1948.

References
The Encyclopedia of Rugby League; Alan Whiticker & Glen Hudson

Australian rugby league players
Sydney Roosters players
Possibly living people
Year of birth missing
Place of birth missing (living people)